Gernot Rumpler (born 21 February 1994) is an Austrian sports shooter. He competed in the men's 10 metre air rifle event at the 2016 Summer Olympics.

References

External links
 
 

1994 births
Living people
Austrian male sport shooters
Olympic shooters of Austria
Shooters at the 2016 Summer Olympics
ISSF rifle shooters
People from Zell am See District
Sportspeople from Salzburg (state)
21st-century Austrian people